Dendrobium mindanaense, known as the Mindanao dendrobium, is an orchid species that is found on the Philippines. It was named for the island of Mindanao.

References 

mindanaense
Endemic orchids of the Philippines
Flora of Mindanao
Epiphytic orchids
Plants described in 1914